Panella is a surname. Notable people with the surname include:
 
Clementina Panella, Italian archaeologist
Frank Panella (1878–1953), American composer
Louis J. Panella (1881-1940) American musician, composer, and teacher 
Jack Panella, American judge
Pasquale Panella, Italian lyricist and writer